Ravanelli  may refer to:
 Renato Ravanelli (born 1965), Italian corporate manager
 Fabrizio Ravanelli (born 1968), Italian football striker and football manager
 Simone Ravanelli (born 1995), Italian cyclist
 Luca Ravanelli (born 1997), Italian football defender
 Ravanelli (Brazilian footballer) (born 1997), Brazilian football attacking midfielder